Phoe Kar (also spelt Phoe Ka and Pho Kar) is a prominent Burmese singer, known for his hit songs, "Lan khwe" and "Ta sein sein kyi". He entered the music industry in 1997 with the album Hman ta chat ye eit-met (မှန်တစ်ချပ်ရဲ့ အိပ် မက်). His daughter, Phu Phu Thit, is also a singer.

Discography

Solo albums 
 Hman ta chat ye eit-met  (1997)
 Hmyaw lin thaw lan  (2002)
 Ta Saint Saint Kyi  (2007)
 To to lay pyaw ba  (2008)
 Eit-met  (2013)
 Phyan khin  (2016)

References

See also 
 Music of Myanmar

Living people
21st-century Burmese male singers
20th-century Burmese male singers
Year of birth missing (living people)